The 1939 Roller Hockey World Cup was the second roller hockey world cup, organized by the Fédération Internationale de Patinage a Roulettes (now under the name of Fédération Internationale de Roller Sports). It was contested by 7 national teams (all from Europe) and it is also considered the 1939 European Roller Hockey Championship and the 1939 Montreux Nations Cup. All the games were played in the city of Montreux, in Switzerland, the chosen city to host the World Cup.

Results

Standings

See also
FIRS Roller Hockey World Cup
CERH European Roller Hockey Championship
Montreux Nations Cup

External links
1939 World Cup in rink-hockey.net historical database

Roller Hockey World Cup
International roller hockey competitions hosted by Switzerland
1939 in roller hockey
1939 in Swiss sport
April 1939 sports events